Adeyton Group is a Cambrian stratigraphic group cropping out in Newfoundland.

References

Cambrian Newfoundland and Labrador